Arraba, also known as 'Arrabat al-Battuf, is an Arab city in Israel. It is located in the Lower Galilee in the Northern District, within Sakhnin valley, adjacent to Sakhnin and Deir Hanna, and climbing a bit on Yodfat range to its south, while also owning some lands south of that in the Beit Netofa Valley (Sahl al-Battuf) to the north of Nazareth area. Arraba attained local council status in 1965, and city status in 2016.

History

Antiquity
Arraba is identified with the ancient Jewish village called Arab, mentioned in Josephus' writings by its pronunciation in the Greek, Gabara, but in the Mishnah and the Jerusalem Talmud as Arab. The first-century Jewish rabbi and leader Yohanan ben Zakkai is said to have lived there eighteen years. During the First Jewish-Roman War, Vespasian sacked the city, killing those of its Jewish citizens who had not already fled. The place is presumed to have been resettled by Jews in the third-fourth centuries, since the town is mentioned as being the place of residence of one of the priestly courses known as Pethahiah, as inscribed in the Caesarea Inscription.

Arabba is home to the grave of Hanina ben Dosa, a Jewish scholar who lived in the village during the first and second generations after the destruction of the Second Temple.

In the 5th or 6th century CE there were Christians living here, as witnessed by a church whose mosaic floor and inscription have been unearthed.

The oldest settled section of Arraba lies at the village's south-east side, near the Christian church. Archaeological artefacts have been discovered there dating back to the Roman and Byzantine periods.

Middle Ages
In the  Crusader era, it was known as  Arabiam. In 1174 it was one of the casalia (villages) given to Phillipe le Rous. In 1236 descendants of Phillipe le Rous confirmed the sale of the fief of Arraba. In 1250 it was one of the casalia belonging to the Teutonic knights, a Crusader order.

In the 13th century Arrabah is mentioned by Syrian geographer Yaqut al-Hamawi in his famous work Mu'jam al-Buldān (1224–1228), as a "place in the province of Acca".

Ottoman Empire 
The village was incorporated into the Ottoman Empire in 1517 with all of Palestine, and in 1596 Arraba appeared in the tax registers as being  in the Nahiya ("Subdistrict") of Tabariyya, part of Sanjak Safad. It had an all Muslim population of 125 households and 2 bachelors. The villagers paid a fixed tax rate of 20% on wheat, barley, summer crops or fruit trees, cotton, and goats or beehives; a total of 11,720 akçe. 1/4 of the revenue went to a waqf.

At some point in the mid-17th century the Zayadina, an Arab Muslim tribe, immigrated to Arraba. Its sheikh ("chief") later acquired control of the town and its district after wresting control of the area from the Druze sheikh of Sallama. Sallama and other Druze villages in the vicinity were subsequently destroyed, Druze suzerainty over the Shaghur district came to an end and the Zayadina consequently gained significant influence in the area, including the role of tax collector of Shaghur on behalf of the Ottoman wali ("governor") of Sidon Province. Arraba became home to Zahir al-Umar, a later sheikh of the Zayadina tribe. According to local legend, he sought refuge there after killing a Turkish soldier. He won the support of the local sheikh, Muhammad Nasser, by helping him settle a score with a neighboring village, which set off  a series of campaigns that led to the conquest of the entire Galilee. A building said to be the home of Zahir is still standing.

In 1838, Arabeh was noted as a Muslim and Christian village in the Esh-Shagur district, located between Safad, Acca and Tiberias.

In 1875 Victor Guérin found Arrabah to have 900 Muslim inhabitants and 100 Greek-Orthodox Christians. In 1881, the PEF's Survey of Western Palestine (SWP) described Arrabet al Buttauf as  "A large stone-built village, containing about 1,000 Moslems and Christians, and surrounded by groves of olives and arable land. Water is obtained from a large birkeh and cisterns. This was the place where Dhaher el Amr´s family was founded, and was long occupied by them."

A population list from about 1887 showed that  Arrabet  had 970 inhabitants; about 80%  Muslim and 20% Catholic Christians.

British Mandate 

In the 1922 census of Palestine, conducted by the British Mandate authorities, Arrabeh had a population of 984, 937 Muslim and 47 Christian, of the Christians, 42 were Melkite, 4 Orthodox and one was Anglican. At the time of the 1931 census, Arraba had 253 occupied houses and a population of 1187 Muslims and 37 Christians.

In the 1945 statistics the population was 1,800; 1,740 Muslims and 60 Christians, with 30,852 dunams (a dunam is a unit of area equivalent to 10 square metres or one-tenth of a hectare) of land, according to an official land and population survey. 3,290 dunams were used for plantations and irrigable land, 14,736 dunams for cereals, while 140 dunams were built-up (urban) land.

Israel in the 20th century 

In 1948, during Operation Hiram (October 29–31), the town surrendered to the advancing Israeli army. Many of the inhabitants fled but some remained. Arraba became a local council in 1965. The village remained under Martial Law until 1966.

Arraba was home to the first Land Day demonstrations in 1976 demanding the state of Israel to stop the expropriation of Palestinian Arab lands. Together with Sakhnin and Deir Hanna, it formed what is called the triangle of Land Day. Israel's reaction to control the protest was forceful and six people were killed by Israeli police. The reason for the Land Day follows:

On March 11, 1976, the Israeli government published an expropriation plan including lands in the Galilee. It affected some 20,000 dunams of land between the Arab villages of Sakhnin and Arraba. The land was said to be used for security purposes but was also used to build new Jewish settlements. David McDowall identifies the resumption of land seizures in the Galilee and the acceleration of land expropriations in the West Bank in the mid-1970s as the immediate catalyst for both the Land Day demonstration and similar demonstrations that were taking place contemporaneously in the West Bank. He writes: "Nothing served to bring the two Palestinian communities together politically more than the question of land."

Israel in the 21st century 
Arraba became a city in 2016. In the late 2010s, Arraba native and Harvard graduate, Nuseir Yassin, gained international acclaim with his Nas Daily videos. In one of the chapters he invites the entire State of Israel to visit his parental home in Arraba.

Economy
The symbol of the local council is an onion, a watermelon and a cantaloupe which symbolize the crops for which Arraba is famous.
Throughout history Arraba was mostly an agricultural village depending mainly on the al-Batuf Plain (Hebrew name: Beit Netofa Valley) to grow crops. However, currently the dependence on agriculture is declining rapidly due to the rise in population, urbanization and a subsequently more modern lifestyle.

Architecture
In the 1870s Guerin saw the mosque which he thought had probably once been a church on the basis of its east–west orientation.  Inside there were two monolithic columns which he took as further proof of its antiquity.

Andrew Petersen, an archaeologist specializing in Islamic architecture, surveyed the place in 1994, and found several interesting buildings.
The modern-day mosque was built in 1953 on the site of an older building. Opposite the mosque is a palatial house with an ablaq entrance made of black and white masonry. This is the house associated with the family of Zahir al-'Umar/Dhaher el-Omar

Sports
The town's football club Ahva Arraba dissolved in 2019 due to debts. It was replaced by a new club, Hapoel Arraba.

Notable people
Asel Asleh, young peace activist killed during the Second Intifada
Ali Nassar (born 1954), film director
Nuseir Yassin, travel video blogger with over 20 million Facebook followers

See also
 Arab localities in Israel
F.C. Bnei Arraba
 Land Day
 House demolition in the Israeli–Palestinian conflict

References

Bibliography

  
 

 
 

  

 

Klein, S. (1909), Galiläa - Beiträge zur Geschichte und Geographie Galiläas (Contributions to the History and Geography of Galilee), Leipzig (in German) 
Klein, S. (1915), "Hebräische Ortsnamen bei Josephus" (Hebrew place names in Josephus), in: MGWJ (Monthly Journal for the History and Science of Judaism), vol. 59, Breslau (in German)

Meyers, E.M. (1976), "Galilean Regionalism as a Factor in Historical Reconstruction," in: Bulletin of the American Schools of Oriental Research (No. 221)

   
 (first printed in 2006)

 

 
Safrai, Z. (1985), The Galilee in the time of the Mishna and Talmud, 2nd edition, Jerusalem (in Hebrew)

External links
Official website 
Welcome To 'Arraba - Buttof
Statistical profile at the Israel Central Bureau of Statistics (2016)
Survey of Western Palestine, Map 6:  IAA, Wikimedia commons

Arab localities in Israel
Local councils in Northern District (Israel)
Arab Christian communities in Israel
First Jewish–Roman War
Ancient Jewish settlements of Galilee